Atte Mäkinen (born May 17, 1995) is a Finnish former professional ice hockey defenceman.

Mäkinen made his SM-liiga debut playing with Tappara during the 2011–12 SM-liiga season.

References

External links

1995 births
Living people
Dragons de Rouen players
Finnish ice hockey defencemen
Lukko players
Mikkelin Jukurit players
Tappara players
Ice hockey people from Tampere